Alfred R. Ludvigsen from Hartland, Wisconsin, was a member of the Wisconsin State Assembly.

Biography
Ludvigsen was born on March 17, 1886, in Merton, Wisconsin. He went to the public schools and to Luther College in Racine, Wisconsin. Ludgivsen was in the farming and landscaping business. He was also involved in the sale and development of lake frontage. He died on June 10, 1968 in the Waukesha County Home Infirmary and is buried in Hartland, Wisconsin.

Career
Ludvigsen served on the Waukesha County Board and as chairman of the Town of Merton from 1923 to 1928. Ludvigsen also served on the Waukesha County Farm Drainage Board. He served member in the Assembly from 1935 to 1956 and was a Republican.

References

People from Merton, Wisconsin
Businesspeople from Wisconsin
Farmers from Wisconsin
Mayors of places in Wisconsin
County supervisors in Wisconsin
Republican Party members of the Wisconsin State Assembly
1886 births
1968 deaths
20th-century American politicians
People from Hartland, Wisconsin
20th-century American businesspeople